Elena Polyakova  (born 22 March 1981) is a Russian female ultramarathon runner, and formerly a female bodybuilder.

Elena Polyakova was born on 22 March 1981 in Znamensk, Astrakhan Oblast, a closed city in Russia. She performed sports in athletics and body building, and won a number of cups. A travel agent from profession, she seasonally was working in Antalya, Turkey since 2005. In September 2011, she met Alper Dalkılıç, a Turkish ultra runner during the 2011 Lycian Way Ultramarathon in southern Turkey. One month after she returned home, she decided to move to Turkey. Since then, she has lived in Istanbul.

Athletics career
Polyakova participated at Istanbul Marathon in 2007 and 2008, without success. From the 2011 Lycian Way Ultramarathon on including, she won all the women's category titles of ultramarathon events held in Turkey.

In 2013, Polyakova won the  Two Castles and an Abbey Trail Ultra in Cyprus.

Achievements

References 

1981 births
Living people
People from Znamensk, Astrakhan Oblast
Russian female bodybuilders
Russian female long-distance runners
Russian female marathon runners
Russian ultramarathon runners
Russian expatriate sportspeople in Turkey
Female ultramarathon runners
Sportspeople from Astrakhan Oblast